Louis Hubert Willem Regout (27 October 1861, Maastricht – 27 October 1915, Rome) was a Dutch politician.

1861 births
1915 deaths
Ministers of Transport and Water Management of the Netherlands
Members of the Senate (Netherlands)
Politicians from Maastricht
Catholic University of Leuven (1834–1968) alumni